The Economic Liberty Act of Georgia was adopted by the Parliament of Georgia in 2011. The act was introduced by President Mikheil Saakashvili in September 2009, as a way of enacting principles based on the Rose Revolution.  The act has been in force since January 1, 2014.

Background
The Parliament of Georgia passed The Economic Liberty Act (ELA) in December 2011. Unlike the initial draft, the final act (a constitutional amendment) contained a reservation which states that a separate Organic Law should define those cases in which the government will still be able to increase taxes without calling a referendum. The Economic Liberty Act is the Organic Law of Georgia and is based on the 4th and 5th parts of Article 94 of the Constitution of Georgia (Constitutional Law of Georgia No 4033 of July 1, 2011).

The act restricted the government from making changes to major economic policy without a popular referendum. It capped the government expenditures at 30% of the GDP, the debt to GDP ratio at 60%, and the budget deficit at 3% of the GDP. Some of these rules were known as the Maastricht criteria, enshrined in the EU Stability and Growth Pact and facilitating the smooth transition to the Eurozone.

The act is intended to restrict the state’s ability to interfere in the affairs of the economy and grant power over tax changes to the people directly. While aiming at reducing the state expenses and debt by 30 and 60 percent respectively, it also explicitly prohibits the government from manipulating taxes without a popular referendum on rates and structure. Currently, the state budget is approximately 30% of the Gross Domestic Product (GDP), and public debt is over 38% of the GDP.

References

Economy of Georgia (country)
Economic policy in Europe
Rose Revolution
2011 in economics
2011 in Georgia (country)
Economic history of Georgia (country)
Law of Georgia (country)
2011 in law